Mariya Dimitrova Petkova (née Vergova; born 3 November 1950 in Plovdiv) is a retired Bulgarian discus thrower. In 1976 she won an Olympic silver medal behind Evelin Schlaak, a standing that would repeat itself in 1980. This year she also achieved a personal best throw of 71.80 metres. In 1982 she won a European Championship silver medal behind countrywoman Tsvetanka Khristova, who is twelve years younger. One year later Petkova won the bronze medal at the first World Championships in Athletics.

Achievements

In 1974 Mariya Petkova bench pressed 210 kg without the use of supportive gear of any kind. This is more than any other woman in history.

External links
 
 

1950 births
Living people
Bulgarian female discus throwers
Olympic athletes of Bulgaria
Athletes (track and field) at the 1976 Summer Olympics
Athletes (track and field) at the 1980 Summer Olympics
Olympic silver medalists for Bulgaria
World record setters in athletics (track and field)
Sportspeople from Plovdiv
Place of birth missing (living people)
World Athletics Championships medalists
European Athletics Championships medalists
Medalists at the 1980 Summer Olympics
Medalists at the 1976 Summer Olympics
Olympic silver medalists in athletics (track and field)
Universiade medalists in athletics (track and field)
Universiade gold medalists for Bulgaria
Medalists at the 1975 Summer Universiade
Medalists at the 1977 Summer Universiade